The 2020 Greenville Triumph SC season was the second season in the soccer team's history, where they competed in the third division of American soccer, USL League One, the second season of that competition. Greenville Triumph SC also participated in the 2020 U.S. Open Cup. Greenville Triumph SC play their home games at Legacy Early College Field, located in Greenville, South Carolina, United States.

Club

Roster 
As of March 3, 2020.

Coaching Staff

Front Office Staff

Competitions

Exhibitions

USL League One

Standings

Results summary

Results by round

Match Results

Playoff Final

Note: Game was cancelled the day before because several Union Omaha players tested positive for COVID-19. Greenville was awarded the title based on points per game average (2.188 to 1.825).

U.S. Open Cup 

As a USL League One club, Greenville will enter the competition in the Second Round, to be played April 7–9. On January 29, 2020 the Second Round schedule was announced.

References

Greenville
Greenville
Greenville Triumph